Lucia es Luna Morena is the 13th album by Mexican iconic pop singer Lucía Méndez, It was released in 1989 then the song Amor de Nadie was added to the album and it was re-released on February 28, 1991.

Track listing (1989)
 Nos Aburriremos Juntos
 Tormenta de Verano
 Devuélveme el Amor
 Juntos por Costumbre
 Nube Viajera
 No Hay Hombres
 ¿Quién Será?
 Secreto (Straniero)
 Luna Morena (Creo en el Amor)
 Poquito de Sabor

Track listing (1991)
 Nos Aburriremos Juntos
 Tormenta de Verano
 Devuélveme el Amor
 Juntos por Costumbre
 Nube Viajera
 Amor de Nadie
 No Hay Hombres
 ¿Quién Será?
 Secreto (Straniero)
 Luna Morena (Creo en el Amor)
 Poquito de Sabor

 Cielo Rojo (Juan Zaizar) is a song recorded for the album México: Voz y Sentimiento which was released in 1990 but not included on the re-release of Luna Morena the next year.

Singles
 Amor de Nadie / Amor de Nadie (Instrumental) (Piano: Luís Reynoso Góngora)
 Tormenta de Verano / Luna Morena (Creo en el Amor)
 Juntos por Costumbre / No Hay Hombres
 Nos Aburriremos Juntos / ¿Quién Será?

Video Clips
 Un Poquito de Sabor
 Tormenta de Verano (Official Video Clip)
 Amor de Nadie (Official Video Clip)
 Devuélveme el Amor
 Secreto
 Juntos por Costumbre (Versión 2) (Official Video Clip)
 Luna Morena (Official Video Clip)
 Juntos por Costumbre (Versión 1)
 Nube Viajera
 No Hay Hombres
 ¿Quién Será?
 Nos Aburriremos Juntos (Official Video Clip)

1989 albums
Lucía Méndez albums